Coryphantha (from Greek, "flowering on the top"), or beehive cactus, is a genus of small to middle-sized, globose or columnar cacti. The genus is native to arid parts of Central America, Mexico, through Arizona, New Mexico, and western Texas and north into southwestern, central, and southeastern Montana. With its two subgenera, 57 species and 20 subspecies, it is one of the largest genera of cactus.

Description
There are four characteristics that distinguish Coryphantha from other cacti.
 Their bodies do not have ribs, just tubercles.
 The flowers form at the top of the plant (the apex or growing end of the stem).
 The tip (podarium) of each flowering tubercle has three parts, the spiny areole, the groove and the axil. Without the groove it is not a Coryphantha.
 The seed coat (or testa) has a net-like pattern (reticulate).
More than many other cacti, the Coryphantha change in their appearance over their lifespan. The presence or absence of a central spine is not indicative of the genus, even in fully adult plants.

Name
The name Coryphantha was first applied by George Engelmann in 1856 as a subgenus, the earlier name Aulacothele of Lemaire having been abandoned. In 1868 Lemaire promoted the group to genus level. Before this all Coryphantha had been classified as Mammillaria.

Species

Synonymy
The genus has two valid synonyms:
Cumarinia Buxb. and
Lepidocoryphantha Backeb.
and three invalid ones:
Aulacothele Monv. (nom. inval.)
Glandulifera (Salm-Dyck) Fric (nom. inval.)
Roseia Fric (nom. inval.)

Related genera
A number of Coryphantha have previously been classified in other genera, indeed the type species C. sulcata was originally named Mammillaria sulcata Other examples include Echinocactus salinensis Poselger 1853 now Coryphantha salinensis (Poselger) Dicht and A.Lüthy 1998 and Neolloydia pulleineana Blackberg 1948 now Coryphantha pulleineana (Blackberg) Glass 1968.

Similarly, a number of other species have been previously classified as Coryphantha. For example, Escobaria vivipara was called Coryphantha vivipara.

Gallery

References

External links
USDA Plants Profile for Coryphantha (beehive cactus)
 USDA Plants Profile: gallery of Coryphantha images 

 
Cactoideae genera
Flora of Central America
Flora of the South-Central United States
Flora of the Southwestern United States
Flora of the Northwestern United States
Cacti of Mexico
Cacti of the United States
Taxa named by George Engelmann